East Sea or Eastern Sea may refer to:
 East China Sea, a marginal sea east of China, where it is called Dōnghǎi (/) in Chinese, meaning "East Sea"
 East Sea (Chinese literature), one of the Four Seas, a literary name for the boundaries of China
 South China Sea, a marginal sea south of China and east and south of Indochina, called Biển Đông in Vietnamese, meaning "East Sea"
 Sea of Japan, a marginal sea between the Korean Peninsula, Russia and the Japanese archipelago, called Donghae (East Sea) in South Korea, and Chosŏn Tonghae (Korean East Sea) in North Korea.
 Sea of Japan naming dispute
 Baltic Sea, called "East Sea" in various languages
 Dead Sea, a salt lake east of Israel, as used in the Bible (Joel 2:20; Ezek. 47:18)
 Mare Orientale, Latin for "Eastern Sea", on the Moon
 Atlantic Ocean, also referred to as the East Sea or Eastern Sea in poetry and other uses in North America
 Pacific Ocean, called the East Sea in poetry and other uses from Australia, New Zealand, China and Japan
 Indian Ocean, earlier called the "Eastern Ocean" or "Eastern Sea"
 Eastern Sea, the eastern ocean of Middle-earth in J. R. R. Tolkien's fiction

See also 
 East Sea Campaign, a naval operation of the Vietnam War
 East Sea Fleet
 Donghai Bridge
 South Sea (disambiguation)
 North Sea  (disambiguation)
 West Sea (disambiguation)
 東海, the Chinese script for "East Sea"
 Donghae (disambiguation), Korean romanization of a solely Korean expression, irrelevant outside of Korea.
 Tokai (disambiguation), Japanese romanization 
 Donghai (disambiguation), Pinyin romanization
 Tunghai (disambiguation), Wade–Giles romanization